The Bridge River is a major tributary of the Fraser River in British Columbia, Canada

Bridge River can also refer to a number of other topics related to the Bridge River including:
Bridge River Country, a historic geographic region and mining district in British Columbia, Canada
Bridge River, British Columbia, the name of three separate towns or localities connected with the Bridge River and its valley
Bridge River Indian Band, a First Nations government in British Columbia, Canada
Bridge River Canyon, a  gorge on the river separating the Shulaps Range and Mission Ridge
Bridge River Power Project, a hydroelectric power development involving the river
Bridge River Cones, a volcanic field located in the uppermost basin of the river
Bridge River Ash, a large volcanic ash deposit that spans from southwestern British Columbia to central Alberta, Canada
Bridge River Ocean, an ancient ocean in the area of what is now the Interior of British Columbia
Bridge River Delta Provincial Park, a provincial park located on the river's upper reaches
Bridge River (Yukon) is a tributary of the Tatshenshini River

See also
Bridge Creek (disambiguation)